Subnautica is an open-world action-adventure game developed and published by Unknown Worlds Entertainment. The game has the player as a non-essential systems maintenance chief who is the only survivor of a spaceship crash on the alien planet 4546B. They are free to explore the oceanic planet, the main objectives being to find essential resources, survive the local flora and fauna, and find a way to escape the planet.

Subnautica was released in early access for Windows in December 2014, macOS in June 2015, and for Xbox One in May 2016. It was released out of early access in January 2018 for macOS and Windows, with versions for PlayStation 4 and Xbox One in December 2018. The physical console versions were published by Gearbox Publishing. The Nintendo Switch, PlayStation 5, and Xbox Series X/S versions were released in May 2021.

By January 2020, more than five million copies had been sold. A standalone expansion, Subnautica: Below Zero, was released May 14, 2021.

Gameplay 
Subnautica is a survival action-adventure game set in an open world environment and played from a first-person perspective. The player controls the lone survivor of the Aurora, Ryley Robinson, as he is stranded on a remote ocean planet known as 4546B.

The main objective is to explore the ocean and survive its dangers, while completing tasks to advance the plot. Players can collect resources, construct tools, build bases, submersibles, and interact with the planet's wildlife.

Some of the most extreme dangers to the player include dangerous fauna like Crabsquids, Stalkers, Crashfish, and Leviathan-class lifeforms like the Reaper, Sea Dragon, Ghost and Peeper Leviathans.

The majority of the game is set underwater, with two explorable islands hidden across the map, and a simulated day-and-night cycle that affects visibility. Upon beginning a new game, players are given an option between four difficulty modes:

In survival mode, the player manages their depleting health, hunger, thirst and oxygen. If the player dies, they respawn, but certain items are removed from their inventory.
In freedom mode, gameplay is near-identical to that of Survival mode, but without hunger and thirst.
In hardcore mode, gameplay includes permanent death. the player dies, they do not respawn, and their save file is instead permanently deleted.
In creative mode, all depleting characteristics, such as health and thirst, are removed, all blueprints are unlocked, and the player can craft without needing resources. Additionally, the submersibles, a stasis rifle, a Seaglide, a mobile vehicle bay, and a propulsion cannon are provided, which do not need an energy source to operate.

The game supports VR headsets, such as the HTC Vive and the Oculus Rift, with the additional input of a keyboard and mouse or game controller.

Plot 
Subnautica takes place in a distant spacefaring future. The Aurora, a deep-space vessel constructed by the Alterra Corporation, has been sent to a system at the outer reaches of known space on its maiden voyage under the pretenses of constructing high-speed space travel infrastructure. Unknown to the crew is that the ship was also sent to the system to search for and, possibly, rescue the crew of a ship named the Degasi, which crashed on planet 4546B ten years prior. As the Aurora does a gravity slingshot around 4546B, it is attacked by a mysterious energy-pulse and crashes on the planet. Several crew members manage to eject from the ship in escape pods, but only the player character—non-essential systems maintenance chief Ryley Robinson—survives. 

During this time, Ryley repairs the radio in his lifepod and gets messages through it from a trading ship called Sunbeam, led by Captain Avery Quinn. Quinn talks to Ryley and states that Sunbeam is on the far side of Andromeda but promises to take Ryley home, telling him that they will pick him up upon landing on a location Precursor Island. As the Sunbeam flies down, a giant alien facility fires upon it and it explodes in mid-air as Ryley watches. If the player manages to disable the facility before the Sunbeam lands, Quinn tells Ryley they are unable to land due to a debris field and will instead inform Alterra Corporation of the situation.

Ryley finds records of the Degasi's crew stating that only three survived the initial crash, but later two out of the three are confirmed dead and one is presumed dead. Ryley also learns of the existence of the 'Precursors', an ancient, advanced alien species that came to planet 4546B approximately one thousand years ago in search of a cure for a highly infectious disease, known as the Kharaa Bacterium. The Precursors discovered Kharaa during the exploration of an unknown planet, and the disease spread due to a failure in quarantine procedures, killing over 140 billion individuals. Investigating thousands of planets in an attempt to find a cure, the Precursors eventually located a species of organism on 4546B they named the Sea Emperor Leviathan, which produced an enzyme that could cure Kharaa. However, the only living Sea Emperor was too old to produce the enzyme in enough potency to have any effect, and the Precursors were unable to force its only eggs to hatch. In an attempt to investigate the egg-hatching process of the Sea Emperor, the Precursors took the egg of a related Leviathan, the fire-breathing Sea Dragon, but the mother destroyed a Precursor research facility and released samples of Kharaa into the planet's ecosystem. Forced to evacuate, the Precursors enabled a facility known as the Quarantine Enforcement Platform, which consists of a large weapon that fires on any ships attempting to leave or land on the planet — including the Degasi, Aurora and Sunbeam.

The Sea Emperor, which seeks the freedom of her children, communicates telepathically with Ryley and helps him discover the prison in which she is held captive. She gives Ryley information on how to hatch her eggs, who does so and is cured by the enzyme produced by the juvenile Sea Emperors. Ryley then disables the Quarantine Enforcement Platform (only achievable by one not infected with Kharaa) and constructs a rocket with blueprints transmitted by Alterra Corporation to the crashed Aurora. After escaping the planet, the Sea Emperor communicates with Ryley a final time, promising that the two "go together" although they are different.

Development 

Subnautica was announced by Unknown Worlds Entertainment on December 17, 2013, with Charlie Cleveland as the director and lead gameplay programmer, and Hugh Jeremy as the producer. The music is composed by Simon Chylinski.

Cleveland was heavily inspired by Minecraft, which he noted "transformed the game industry" and "threw away all traditional challenge oriented and progression oriented games". The release of Minecraft overlapped with Unknown Worlds releasing Natural Selection 2. Feeling exhausted, the team wanted to try something new and decided to make such a game. Other influences included scuba diving, the filmography of James Cameron, and "just the feeling of exploring the deep, dark, alternately beautiful and terrible, ocean depths. Feeling like I’m an explorer, almost an astronaut, not knowing what I’ll find". Cleveland did not initially view it as a survival game but as an exploration game.

Cleveland was also motivated by the Sandy Hook Elementary School shooting. Frustrated by lack of progress made in the US toward ending gun violence, Cleveland thought that he could do his part by making a non-violent game. As such, the development team opted against the inclusion of ballistic firearms (with non-lethal firearms like a stasis rifle instead) in the game, with Cleveland describing the game as "one vote towards a world with less guns" encouraging players to think about "non-violent and more creative solutions to solve our problems".

The development team opted to use the Unity engine rather than Spark, the engine used for the company's previous game, Natural Selection 2. Subnautica producer Hugh Jeremy justified this decision because of the different demands that the game places on the engine, and "because [the team] does not include people working on Spark, it's not appropriate for Subnautica to use Spark. By using Unity for Subnautica, Spark can continue to develop in certain directions, while Subnautica develops in others. To use Spark for Subnautica would be like trying to fit a square peg in a round hole."

The game lacks traditional missions or quest structure usually found in video games. This was a deliberate choice, with Cleveland stating "with intrinsic rewards, people are instead encouraged to just do the activities for their own merit, less people would be motivated to do it. But, if they did get over that learning period they would get to the point where they internalized that activity as pleasurable on its own and they would continue". Cleveland opted for this after reading an essay by Jamie Cheng who implemented similar philosophies into his game Don't Starve.

Early access versions of Subnautica were released on Steam Early Access on December 16, 2014 and on Xbox One Preview on May 17, 2016. During this initial release the game featured no hunger or thirst mechanics. After receiving criticism, specifically from one player whose critique "struck home for me", the team opted to include such a system eventually discovering that it helped players orient themselves to the early parts of the game. The full version of the game was released on January 23, 2018, for macOS and Windows personal computers, and on December 4, 2018, for PlayStation 4 and Xbox One consoles. The Nintendo Switch, PlayStation 5 and Xbox Series X/S versions of the game and a sequel, called Subnautica: Below Zero, were released on May 14, 2021. Previously, Below Zero was released in early access on January 30, 2019.

Reception 

Subnautica received positive pre-release reception. Ian Birnbaum of PC Gamer described Subnautica as an "underwater Minecraft", remarking that "with an experienced developer at the helm and a limitless variety of the oceans to play with, it's going to take a lot for Subnautica to go badly wrong. As the toolbox gets deeper and the shape of the end-game gets set, Subnautica will be a unique example of the ways survival can be tense, rewarding, and fun." Marsh Davies of Rock, Paper, Shotgun praised the rewarding nature of exploring the world of Subnautica, but criticized the "arbitrariness" and lack of intuition in some of the in-game recipes.

At launch, the game received "generally positive reviews" on all platforms according to review aggregator Metacritic. Ben "Yahtzee" Croshaw on The Escapist's Zero Punctuation series gave it a generally positive review, stating, "Underwater exploration is an inherently appealing concept: this whole new world rolling away before you, made all the more beautiful by its utter hostility." He criticized the game as "a little unintuitive and a little buggy". Croshaw would later list Subnautica as his second favorite game of 2018. The popular gamer Ethan "E-MAN-MLG" Christianson later went on to say that "This game is so amazing, the beautiful and terrifying detail that went into the game is simply breathtaking!" Popular Youtuber, Markiplier later went on to say that the game was also very well made.

By January 2020, more than 5.23 million copies had been sold across all platforms, not including free copies given as part of promotions.

Accolades

Notes

References

External links
 
 

2018 video games
Action-adventure games
Fiction set on ocean planets
MacOS games
Nintendo Switch games
Open-world video games
PlayStation 4 games
Scuba diving video games
Indie video games
Single-player video games
Survival video games
Unknown Worlds Entertainment games
Video games developed in the United States
Video games set on fictional planets
Video games with underwater settings
Windows games
Xbox Cloud Gaming games
Xbox One games